Mutual Tower is a 252k-square foot, 14-story skyscraper located in Durham, North Carolina. Built in 1968, the building was previously called the North Carolina Mutual Life Insurance Company Building, Legacy Tower and The Tower at Mutual Plaza. It was designed by M.A. Ham Associates and Welton Becket and Associates. From 1968 to 1987 this building was Durham's tallest.

History
North Carolina Mutual Life Insurance Company, later called NC Mutual, built the building to serve as its headquarters, replacing the Mechanics and Farmers Bank Building. The words "NC Mutual Life" are shown at the top on all four sides. The company sold the building in 2006 to Greenfire Real Estate Holdings, which is led by Michael Lemanski, for $10.5 million. After the sale, Greenfire redeveloped the building and changed the name to Legacy Tower. Lemanski led a diverse group of mostly local investors which bought the building in 2017. In 2017, Lemanski led another $11 million renovation of the property through his firm New South Ventures.

NC Mutual reduced the amount of space it uses from six stories to one, making 60,000 square feet available for other companies. At one time renovation plans included removing the NC Mutual signs. Those stayed on two sides of the building. The building's name also changed to The Tower at Mutual Plaza.

In October 2020, Turnbridge Equities bought the building for $37.2 million in a foreclosure auction from 411 West Street Chapel Hill LLC.

Turnbridge announced $10 million in renovations, with both interior and exterior work, to what it now calls Mutual Tower.

References

External links

Office buildings completed in 1965
Skyscraper office buildings in North Carolina
Skyscrapers in Durham, North Carolina